Puchong Jaya is a township in Puchong, Subang Jaya, Petaling District, Selangor, Malaysia. It is located between Bandar Sunway and Bandar Kinrara and was developed by IOI Group.

Mall
IOI Mall Puchong

Bandar Puchong Community Online 
 www.BandarPuchong.com Bandar Puchong Community Online

Petaling District
Townships in Selangor